The Mazda Kabura is a concept car shown by the Japanese manufacturer Mazda in 2006.

Concept overview
The Kabura, introduced at the 2006 North American International Auto Show, is a sport compact which shows styling themes and technologies which could appear in future production models. It was designed in Irvine, California by Mazda of North America design chief Franz von Holzhausen, who designed the Pontiac Solstice.

Kabura incorporates the front-engine, rear-drive layout similar to the Mazda MX-5 and the Mazda RX-8 and hints of physical design characteristics similar to the Mazda RX-8 and the discontinued Mazda MX-3.  Instead of a typical 2+2 layout, the Kabura has an unusual 3+1 arrangement, giving greater passenger space versus a traditional coupe, without increasing weight or size.  All passenger seats fold flat to make additional room for cargo.

“Kabura” is a Japanese term taken from kabura-ya, an arrow that makes a howling sound when fired, and was historically used to signal the start of a battle.  This “first arrow into battle” is meant to represent Mazda's pursuit of unique styling themes and technologies - such as the rotary engine.  Kabura represents the first Mazda compact coupe for the 21st century.  Mazda has not announced plans to build a production version of the Kabura, but the design embodies several innovations that Mazda could implement when a compact sports coupe is ready for production.  One of Kabura's roles is exposing a possible future design direction for a new model.

Power is supplied to Kabura concept's rear wheels from a 2.0 L version of Mazda's MZR DOHC 16-valve engine.  The Kabura uses 245/35R19 Bridgestone Potenza front tires and 245/35R20 tires at the rear. While this concept has been assembled with several MX-5 chassis components, the basic dimensions fall between the MX-3 and the RX-8.  As a sport compact, it would have slotted below the RX-8 in the Mazda lineup.

Exterior

The Kabura's exterior is described as a wide "powerful" stance, with pronounced wheel arches and taut surfaces, reminiscent of classic coupes.  The windshield and forward portion of the roof are integrated into one seamless glass surface that extends from the cowl to the B-pillar.  Overhead portions of the glass have adjustable tinting, so that the driver can adjust a knob to change the roof's opacity, as desired, from clear to completely opaque.

Behind the B-pillar is a two-piece glass hatch.  The uppermost glass panel normally lies flush.  When pivoted-up by an electric motor, it acts as a roof spoiler, which also vents air from the interior and increases rear passenger headroom. A photovoltaic solar cell in the panel helps to control interior temperature, as well as helping recharge the battery for powering accessories.  The larger glass hatch panel has side-mounted hinges to provide access to the Kabura's cargo compartment.

Interior
The unique 3+1 interior layout is designed to provide comfortable seating for one or two tandem passengers to the right of the driver, with only occasional use of the fourth "jump-seat" behind the driver as needed.

The driver's door provides access to the driver's cockpit, and to the rear jump seat. The other side of the car is a purposely asymmetrical arrangement.  Eliminating the glovebox and minimizing the instrument panel allows shifting the front passenger about six-inches ahead of the driver's seating position.  In turn, the second inside passenger, sitting in tandem behind the inside passenger, has approximately the same leg, shoulder, and headroom as the front passenger.  The Kabura includes a secondary passenger-side door, allowing easier access to the seat behind the front passenger.  After the front door is opened, touching a button slides the rear door straight back into a cavity notched into the rear-quarter panel area, instead of swinging on hinges.

Kabura's concept interior is produced from regenerated leather substrate, mostly from post-industrial waste recovered from the manufacturing of Nike brand athletic shoes.

Specifications
Length: 4.05 m (159.4 in.)
Width:  1.78 m (70.1 in.)
Height: 1.28 m (50.4 in.)
Wheelbase: 2.55 m (100.4 in.)
Seating capacity: 4 person (3+1 seating)
Engine: MZR 2.0 L DOHC 16-Valve
Transmission: 6MT manual
Suspension （F/R）: Double Wishbone / Multi-Link
Tires - Front: 245/35 R19
Tires - Rear: 245/35 R20

Production version
A production version of the Kabura was rumoured for the 2009 model year.  Slotting in as an entry-level alternative to the RX-8 2+2, the Kabura was said to borrow significant mechanical components from the MX-5 roadster while having a similar shape to the MX-3. Although it never entered production, the 2011 RX-8 refresh drew inspiration from the Kabura.

References

External links
Initial Ford/Mazda Media PR release
Final Ford/Mazda Media Press Release
Road & Track magazine report
Official Mazda USA Kabura web site

Kabura
Sports cars
Rear-wheel-drive vehicles
Cars introduced in 2006